Abel Thomas Frederick "Fred" Bunn (7 February 1861 – 20 November 1921) was an English footballer who played at centre half. He was born in West Bromwich and attended Christ Church School, before working at the local George Salter's Spring Works. He played for West Bromwich Albion from September 1879 and scored in the 1883 Staffordshire Senior Cup Final as Albion won their first ever trophy. In 1885, Bunn became one of the club's first professionals when the FA legalised payments to players. He left the club the following year to join Crosswell's Brewery, after disagreements with some of the Albion committee members. He finished his career at Oldbury Town.

References

1861 births
1921 deaths
Sportspeople from West Bromwich
English footballers
West Bromwich Albion F.C. players
Crosswell's Brewery F.C. players
Oldbury Town F.C. players
Association football central defenders